The Confederation of Tennis of Central America and the Caribbean (COTECC) is the dependency of the International Tennis Federation (ITF) in the region whose objective is to implement policies that develop tennis in Central America and the Caribbean. The organization is based in the Santo Domingo, Dominican Republic, and is made up of 34 countries.

The purpose of COTECC is to encourage, direct, organize, regulate, govern and disseminate the practice of tennis; organize, sponsor and / or run tournaments, championships, training programs and workshops for the National Tennis Federations of the Caribbean and Central America; and maintain affiliation with the ITF on behalf of the geographic area of the Caribbean and Central America.

COTECC is one of the six regional tennis divisions worldwide, together with the South American Tennis Confederation (Cosat), the African Tennis Confederation (CAT), the Asian Tennis  Federation (ATF), the Tennis Federation of Oceania (OTF) and the European Tennis Association (TE). 

The regional body has two Development Officers whose purpose is to continue raising the level of tennis in the region. One of them is Cecilia Ancalmo, from El Salvador, in charge of Central America and the Spanish-speaking countries of the Caribbean; and John Goede, from Suriname, responsible for the English, French and Dutch Caribbean nations.

History 
COTECC was created in 1992 as one of the points discussed in the Annual General Meeting of the ITF held in La Romana, Dominican Republic, in which it was agreed to create a governing body for tennis that would unite the countries of Central America, the Spanish Caribbean and the English Caribbean.

It was that same year, in Mexico, the COTECC statutes were signed and also the Mexican Jesus Topete was selected as the first president of the Confederation for a period of two years.

However, as the former president of the organism Gonzalo Mejía says, there were other organizations that preceded COTECC as tennis governing body in the area, although they never received recognition from the ITF. In 1968, as a result of the beginning of the Open Era, tennis was left out of the Olympics, which automatically meant that it was not an official sport in the Pan American or the Central American and Caribbean Games.

This situation resulted in several countries founding the Pan-American Tennis Confederation in 1971, which had the recognition of the national Olympic committees of all America, which produced the return of tennis to the Central Americans and the Caribbean Santo Domingo 74 and the Pan American Games of Mexico 75.

Mejía adds that for the year 1982, during Central American and Caribbean Games in Havana, Cuba, it formed the basis for creating the COTECC that we currently have: the Central American and Caribbean Confederation of Tennis, with a large part of the countries that make it up today.

President

The COTECC elections for the Steering Committee are held every two years at the Annual General Meeting, in which the member countries choose a president, two vice-presidents, two directors and each of the four heads of the subregions.

The current president is Persio Maldonado, from the Dominican Republic, who was re-elected last June for the period 2018-2020. In 2016, Maldonado assumed the presidency of the institution for the first time.

Maldonado relies on the Salvadoran Enrique Molins, who was leading the regional body between 2000 and 2016, this being the longest period for a president in the history of COTECC.

Prior to Molins and Maldonado were presidents Jesús Topete, from Mexico, (1992-1996), and Gonzalo Mejía, from the Dominican Republic, (1996-2000).

Affiliated members

These are the members of COTECC:

References

 
Tennis organizations
1992 establishments in North America
Central America and the Caribbean